The following is a list of events that happened during 1987 in Cape Verde.

Incumbents
President: Aristides Pereira
Prime Minister: Pedro Pires

Events

Sports
Boavista Praia  won the Cape Verdean Football Championship

Births
January 2: Pedro Celestino Silva Soares, footballer
March 18: Gilson Manuel Silva Alves, footballer
March 27: Roberto Xalino, singer
March 31: Odaïr Fortes, footballer
June 9: Ballack, footballer
June 12: Tom Tavares, footballer
August 5: Nilson António, footballer
November 25: Ericson Silva, footballer

References

 
Years of the 20th century in Cape Verde
1980s in Cape Verde
Cape Verde
Cape Verde